Khalifah Khaled Suleiman (born 1953) is a Jordanian jurist and politician who briefly served as justice minister from May to October 2012.

Early life and education
Suleiman was born in 1953. He obtained a master's degree in law from the University of Jordan.

Career
Suleiman worked at different positions in the Jordanian judiciary system beginning in 1981. His previous posts include vice president of the cassation court and general prosecutor. He was appointed justice minister to the cabinet headed by Fayez Tarawneh on 2 May 2012. He replaced Salim Al Zoubi. Khalifah's term lasted until October 2012 and he was replaced by Ghaleb Zubi. Khalifah was appointed president of the Higher Court of Justice in November 2012.

References

1953 births
Living people
University of Jordan alumni
Government ministers of Jordan
Justice ministers of Jordan